The Columbia Southern Railway Passenger Station and Freight Warehouse is a historic train station at the intersection of Clark and Fulton Streets in Wasco, Oregon. The station was built in 1898 by the Columbia Southern Railway as part of a new line connecting inland Oregon to the Columbia River. The Wasco depot served both passenger and freight trains along the route, which reached as far south as Shaniko and spurred economic development in the region. While the Oregon Trunk Railway's new line to Bend became the main inland Oregon route in 1911, the Columbia Southern route continued to serve Sherman County as a local route. Passenger service to Wasco ended in 1936, and a 1964 flood damaged the line severely enough to permanently end freight services as well.

The station was listed on the National Register of Historic Places on February 19, 1991.

See also
 National Register of Historic Places listings in Sherman County, Oregon

References

1898 establishments in Oregon
Former railway stations in Oregon
National Register of Historic Places in Sherman County, Oregon
Railway buildings and structures on the National Register of Historic Places in Oregon
Railway freight houses on the National Register of Historic Places
Railway stations on the National Register of Historic Places in Oregon
Railway stations in the United States opened in 1898
Transportation buildings and structures in Sherman County, Oregon
Union Pacific Railroad stations in Oregon